CG-2 (Carretera General 2) is a road of the Andorra Road Network that connects Escaldes-Engordany to the border with France.

This road starts at the Encamp roundabout, CG-1 and ends at the Dos Valires Tunnel in the French border (N22). It is also called Carretera de França.

References

Roads in Andorra